Genki Shock! is a 2006 album by the female Japanese rock trio Shonen Knife. The cover design was created by singer/guitarist Naoko Yamano's toddler daughter, Emma.

Track listing

Japanese edition
The cover of the Japanese edition has a yellow background.
["Original Japanese" - "Romaji ~ Translation"]
 "イントロダクション" - "Intorodakushon ~ Introduction"
 "ロック ソサエティ" - "Rokku Sosaeti ~ Rock Society"
 "スパム警告" - "Supamu Keikoku ~ Spam Warning"
 "アニメ現象" - "Anime Genshō ~ Anime Phenomenon"
 "蜘蛛の家" - "Kumo no Ie ~ Spider House"
 "めがね" - "Megane ~ Glasses"
 "暗黒の女王" - "Ankoku no Joō ~ The Queen of Darkness"
 "森林浴" - "Shinrinyoku ~ Forest Walk"
 "ジーンズブルー" - "Jīnzuburū ~ Jeans Blue"
 "枕の下に" - "Makura no Shita Ni ~ Under My Pillow"
 "世界地図" - "Sekai Chizu ~ A World Atlas"
 "ブロッコリーマン" - "Burokkorī Man ~ Broccoli Man"
 "ジャイアント キティ" - "Jaianto Kiti ~ Giant Kitty"

US edition
The cover of the United States edition has a pink background.
 "Introduction"   – 0:41  
 "S*P*A*M"   – 3:33  
 "Jeans Blue"   – 3:06  
 "Anime Phenomenon"   – 3:58 
 "Spider House"   – 4:15  
 "My Magic Glasses"   – 4:20  
 "The Queen of Darkness"   – 4:49  
 "Forest Walk"   – 4:48  
 "A World Atlas"  – 3:35  
 "Broccoli Man"  – 3:35  
 "Rock Society"   – 2:31  
 "Under My Pillow"   – 4:27  
 "Giant Kitty"   – 4:35

Personnel
Naoko Yamano - guitar, vocals
Atsuko Yamano - bass, drums, backing vocals

References

Shonen Knife albums
2006 albums